Gajuwaka Assembly constituency is a constituency in Visakhapatnam district of Andhra Pradesh. It is one of the seven assembly segments of Visakhapatnam (Lok Sabha constituency), along with Bheemili, Visakhapatnam East, Visakhapatnam South, Visakhapatnam North and Visakhapatnam West. Nagireddy Tippala is the present MLA of the constituency, who won the 2019 Andhra Pradesh Legislative Assembly election from YSR Congress Party. , in terms of registered number of electors, it is the largest assembly constituency in the state with a total of 309,326 electors.

Mandals 
There are Two mandals that come under this constituency..

Members of Legislative Assembly Gajuwaka

Election Results

Assembly election results 2019

Assembly elections 2014

Assembly Elections 2009

See also 
 List of constituencies of the Andhra Pradesh Legislative Assembly

References 

Assembly constituencies of Andhra Pradesh